47th Division may refer to:

Infantry divisions
 47th Reserve Division (German Empire) 
 47th Landwehr Division (German Empire)
 47th Infantry Division (Wehrmacht)
 47th Volksgrenadier Division (Wehrmacht)
 47th Infantry Division Bari (Kingdom of Italy)
 47th Division (Imperial Japanese Army)
 47th (1/2nd London) Division (United Kingdom, World War I)
 47th (London) Infantry Division (United Kingdom, World War II)
 47th Infantry Division (United States)

Aviation divisions
 47th Air Division (United States)